The Petrie Museum of Egyptian Archaeology in London is part of University College London Museums and Collections. The museum contains over 80,000 objects and ranks among some of the world's leading collections of Egyptian and Sudanese material.

History

The museum was established as a teaching resource for the Department of Egyptian Archaeology and Philology at University College at the same time as the department was established in 1892. The initial collection was donated by the writer Amelia Edwards. The first Edwards Professor, William Matthew Flinders Petrie, conducted many important excavations, and in 1913 he sold his collections of Egyptian antiquities to University College, creating the Flinders Petrie Collection of Egyptian Antiquities, and transforming the museum into one of the leading collections outside Egypt.  The collection was first put on display in June 1915. Petrie excavated dozens of major sites in the course of his career, including the Roman Period cemeteries at Hawara, famous for the beautiful mummy portraits in classical Roman style; Amarna, the city of king Akhenaten; and the first true pyramid, at Meydum, where he uncovered some of the earliest evidence for mummification.

The collection and library were arranged in galleries within the main building at the university and a guidebook was published in 1915. Initially, the collection's visitors were students and academics; it was not then open to the general public. Petrie retired from University College London (UCL) in 1933, though his successors continued to add to the collections, excavating in other parts of Egypt and Sudan. During the Second World War (1939–1945) the collection was packed up and moved out of London for safekeeping. In the early 1950s it was moved into a former stable, where it remains adjacent to the DMS Watson science library of UCL.

Current description

The museum is at Malet Place, near Gower Street and the University College London science library. Admission is free, no booking required, and as of March 2022 the museum is open Tuesday to Friday between 1 pm and 5 pm, and Saturday between 11 am and 5 pm. Researchers accommodated on Mondays between 10 am and 1 pm and 2 pm and 4 pm via prior appointment.
 
The museum has an exhibitions and events programme for adults and families, and has an active Friends of the Petrie Museum organisation allowing members to attend lectures, museum seminars, tours to Egypt and Egyptian collections, social events, and so on. As well, the Friends raise funds towards the conservation, publication and display of the Petrie Museum's outstanding collection.

Organisation and collections

The museum is split into three galleries. The main gallery (housed above the old stables) contains many of the museum's small domestic artefacts, mummy portraits and cases, and the Inscriptions Aisle. The Inscriptions Aisle displays tablets, including Pyramid Texts, written in hieroglyphics, hieratic, Greek, and Arabic, and organised according to material type. Another gallery (the pottery gallery) contains many cabinets of pottery, clothing, jewellery, and shabti figures, arranged chronologically.  A new entrance gallery was refurbished in 2019 which provides an insight into the history of the museum, its collections, and notable figures.

The entire collection has been digitised and the catalogue can be browsed and consulted online.

Notable holdings

The collection contains some significant 'firsts': one of the earliest pieces of linen from Egypt (about 5000 BC); two lions from the temple of Min at Koptos, from the first group of monumental sculpture (about 3000 BC, these are located outside the provost's office in the Wilkins Building on Gower Street); a fragment from the Palermo Stone (first kinglist or calendar, about 2900 BC); the earliest example of metal from Egypt, the first worked iron beads; the earliest 'cylinder seal' in Egypt (about 3500 BC); the oldest wills on papyrus paper; the oldest gynaecological papyrus and the only veterinary papyrus from ancient Egypt (access available upon request); and the largest architectural drawing, showing a shrine (about 1300 BC).

Costume is another strength of the collection. In addition to the Tarkhan Dress (the 'oldest dress') there is a unique beadnet dress of a dancer from the Pyramid Age (about 2400 BC), two long sleeved robes of the same date, a suit of armour from the palace of Memphis, as well as socks and sandals from the Roman period. The collection contains works of art from Akhenaten’s city at Amarna: colourful tiles, carvings and frescoes, from many other important Egyptian and Nubian settlements and burial sites. The museum houses the world’s largest collection of Roman period mummy portraits (first to second centuries AD).

The collection also includes material from the Ptolemaic, Roman and Islamic periods.

There is a substantial archive held in the museum, including excavation records, correspondence and photographs relating to excavations led by Flinders Petrie. There are additionally documents relating to the distribution of finds from fieldwork to museums worldwide between 1887 and 1949.

Reputation

The museum specialises in objects of daily use, containing over 80,000 objects and ranks among some of the world's leading collections of Egyptian and Sudanese material.  It only ranks behind the collections of the Cairo Museum, The British Museum and the Ägyptisches Museum, Berlin in number and quality of items. The museum contains many 'firsts', such as the Tarkhan Dress, confirmed as the world's oldest woven garment.

Published works
In 2007 Left Coast Press published Living Images: Egypian Funerary Portraits in the Petrie Museum, edited by Janet Picton, Stephen Quirke, and Paul C. Roberts.  This book is on the Roman mummy portraits from the Fayum and details their conservation work. 

In 2014 Bloomsbury Press published Archaeology of Race which "explores the application of racial theory to interpret the past in Britain during the late Victorian and Edwardian period." The book, written by Debbie Chalice, specifically focuses on how Flinders Petrie applied the ideas of Francis Galton on inheritance and race to the discipline of archaeology. 

In 2015 UCL Press published a multi-author compilation of articles, The Petrie Museum of Egyptian Archaeology: Characters and Collections, which is available in both print and via a free open access download. It is edited by Alice Stevenson.

See also
 List of museums of Egyptian antiquities

References

Bibliography
 .
 .
 
Open access pdf download.
 .
 .

Further reading

External links

Petrie Museum website
UCL Museum Collections blog
Friends of the Petrie Museum
Information at Culture24
Digital Egypt site
Characters and Collections e-book

UCL Institute of Archaeology
Archaeological museums in London
Museums of University College London
Museums established in 1892
Egyptological collections in London
University museums in England
Museums in the London Borough of Camden
Musical instrument museums
1892 establishments in England
University museums